George Schwiening (born 15 December 1994) is an English international athlete. She has represented England at the Commonwealth Games.

Biography
Schwiening was educated at the University of Bath and is a former World Junior Duathlon Champion. She switched to marathon running following problems over European duathlon Covid-related travel restrictions and disruption.

In 2022, she was selected for the women's marathon event at the 2022 Commonwealth Games in Birmingham, where she finished in 11th place in a time of 2:40:09. In December 2022 she took part in the Valencia marathon and finished in a time of 2:26:28.

References

1994 births
Living people
British female long-distance runners
British female marathon runners
English female long-distance runners
English female marathon runners
Commonwealth Games competitors for England
Athletes (track and field) at the 2022 Commonwealth Games
21st-century English women